Alta Colleges, Inc., headquartered in Denver, was  a company that owned three for-profit schools—Westwood College, Westwood College Online, and Redstone College. The college was founded in 1953, as Radio and Television Repair Institute and became the Denver Institute of Technology in 1974. Kirk Riedinger and Jamie Turner acquired the company in 1987 and began expanding into technical programs. The school opened its first campus outside of Denver in Los Angeles, California in 1999.

Westwood College at one time had 17 campuses across California, Colorado, Georgia, Illinois, Texas and Virginia, as well as an online campus. Westwood College offered 27 degree programs, including in business, design, technology, industrial services, justice and health care. More than 20,000 students graduated from Westwood College. "Over 75 percent of adult Americans don't have bachelor's degrees," Alta College co-founder Kirk Riedinger told the Denver Business Journal in June 2002. "We offer career-focused education to prepare students who are launching a career, changing a career or enhancing a career. Our curriculum is constantly updated based on the industry and the feedback we receive."

Legal issues
On April 20, 2009, the United States Department of Justice announced that Alta Colleges had agreed to pay the U.S. government $7 million to resolve allegations under the False Claims Act that Alta's Texas schools submitted false claims for federal student aid funds. The college admitted no wrongdoing and was not required to change any of its practices.

In January 2012 the Illinois attorney general's office announced it would sue Westwood college for misleading students.  The suit was settled in 2015.

References

Distance education institutions based in the United States
Education companies of the United States
Former for-profit universities and colleges in the United States
Educational institutions established in 1953
1953 establishments in Colorado